, also known as Invented Inference, is a 2011 Japanese novel published by Kodansha and written by Kyo Shirodaira with illustrations by Hiro Kyohara. In 2019 it was republished with illustrations by Chasiba Katase as part of a series. A manga adaptation with art by Chasiba Katase has been serialized since April 2015 in Kodansha's shōnen manga magazine Shōnen Magazine R and since December 2019, also in Monthly Shōnen Magazine. It has been collected in eighteen tankōbon volumes. The manga is published in North America by Kodansha Comics. An anime television series adaptation produced by Brain's Base aired between January and March 2020. A second season premiered in January 2023.

Plot
While struggling to get past a break-up with his girlfriend, Kuro Sakuragawa was approached by Kotoko Iwanaga, a girl who declared that she was in love with Kuro since she met him two years ago. She then tells him that she is a sort of Goddess of Wisdom where she serves as the intermediary between the real world and the supernatural world. Kuro, of course, doubts her at first but after fighting a yōkai in a library and revealing to each other their true identities (Kuro is actually a monster that has eaten two different yōkai meats giving him the powers of immortality and near-absolute precognition), Kuro agrees to help Kotoko on her various adventures as the peace-keeping Goddess of Wisdom.

Characters

Main characters

A young university student with one eye and one leg, which she adapted at the age of 11 after becoming acquainted with the yōkai request of her wisdom. 

A young university student with instantaneous healing abilities, which he acquired at the age of 11 after consuming yōkai flesh. 

A young police officer and Kuro's former girlfriend.

A gravure idol who gained a niche following after starring in a late night TV drama.

A police detective and a subordinate of Yumihara.

The older cousin of Kuro Sakuragawa and the reason he visits the hospital on a regular basis.

Kazuyuki Konno

Marumi Oki

Yōkai

Media

Novel
In/Spectre is a novel written by Kyo Shirodaira with illustrations by Hiro Kyohara that was released in 2011 on Kodansha's Kodansha Novels imprint and was republished in 2015 under Kodansha Bunko imprint. In 2018, it changed imprint to Kodansha Taiga and the illustrator to Chasiba Katase, and has continued as a series since then. Some short stories collected in the series have been previously published in the Mephisto magazine.

Manga
A manga adaptation by Chasiba Katase originally began on the Kodansha's Shōnen Magazine R in April 2015. In October 2019, Kodansha announced that Shōnen Magazine R would stop its print publication and be a digital-only publication, and with it, they also announced that the manga would be published in Monthly Shōnen Magazine, starting on December 6, 2019, along the digital release on Shōnen Magazine R and on Kodansha app Magazine Pocket. Shōnen Magazine R was discontiniued in January 2023.

Anime
An anime television series adaptation of the manga series was announced on January 14, 2019. It is produced by Brain's Base and directed by Keiji Gotoh, with Noboru Takagi writing the scripts and Takatoshi Honda designing the characters. It aired between January 11 and March 28, 2020, on TV Asahi, MBS, and BS-NTV for 12 episodes. Lie and a Chameleon performed the series' opening theme song , while Mamoru Miyano performed the series' ending theme song "Last Dance". 
 
Crunchyroll co-produced and streaming the series. Viz Media released the series on home video.

On November 26, 2020, it was announced that the series will be receiving a second season. The staff are set to reprise their roles, with Kentarou Matsumoto replacing Takatoshi Honda as character designer and chief animation director. The series was scheduled to air in October 2022, but was later delayed. It premiered on January 9, 2023, on Tokyo MX and BS-NTV.

Episode list

Season 1 (2020)

Season 2 (2023)

Reception
The manga has over two million volumes in print. In 2018, it was nominated for Best Shōnen Manga at the 42nd annual Kodansha Manga Award.

Notes

References

External links
 

2011 Japanese novels
Anime series based on manga
Brain's Base
Crunchyroll anime
Crunchyroll Originals
Kodansha books
Kodansha manga
Muse Communication
Mystery anime and manga
Romance anime and manga
Shōnen manga
Supernatural thriller anime and manga
Tokyo MX original programming
TV Asahi original programming